The Iran women's national rugby union sevens team represents Iran in women's rugby sevens. They participated at the Asia Rugby Sevens Women’s Trophy 2021 in Doha, Qatar; they placed third at the tournament.

History
Women's rugby was first introduced in Iran in the early 2000s. The women's sevens team played in August 2010 in Cortina d'Ampezzo, Italy. In 2012 Iran competed at the Asia Rugby Women's Sevens in Pune, India in October. They defeated India to take 11th place.

References

Rugby union in Iran
Women's national rugby sevens teams
rugby